Emily Weiss (born March 22, 1985) is an American businesswoman. She is the founder and former CEO of the cosmetics company Glossier and the blog Into the Gloss. She was featured in the Forbes 30 Under 30 list in 2015. In 2019, she was included in Time magazine's "Next 100".

Early life and education
Emily Weiss was raised in Wilton, Connecticut. Her father worked as an executive at Pitney Bowes and her mother stayed at home. In high school, Weiss interned at Ralph Lauren for two summers and briefly had a modeling career.  While interning at Teen Vogue in college, she appeared on The Hills on a three-episode arc with Lauren Conrad and Whitney Port. Weiss graduated from New York University in 2007 with a degree in studio art. She was a fashion assistant at W magazine and an on-set styling assistant for Vogue where she assisted Elissa Santisi.

Career

Into the Gloss
Weiss launched Into the Gloss, a blog featuring predominantly interviews with women, in September 2010. She stayed at her day job at Vogue and worked on Into the Gloss in the mornings between the hours of 4 a.m. and 8 a.m. A popular series on the blog is Top Shelf, where subjects are interviewed in their bathrooms and photos of their shelves and medicine cabinets are featured. Previous interviews include Jenna Lyons and Karlie Kloss. By early 2012, the site had more than 200,000 unique visitors per month. By May 2016, the site garnered 1.3 million visitors. After Weiss reached 10 million page views per month and acquired corporate partnerships for the site and a small staff, she quit her job at Vogue to focus on her business ventures full time.

Glossier
In 2014, Weiss started approaching venture capitalists with ideas for expansion, including a potential Into the Gloss-curated e-commerce platform. Weiss eventually raised $2 million in seed funding, with the help of venture capitalist Kirsten Green, the founder of San Francisco-based Forerunner Ventures. Weiss used this initial investment to hire a small team and launch Glossier.com.

In October 2014, Weiss introduced Glossier's first four products on her Into the Gloss blog and announced the launch of Glossier.com. The Glossier team launched the e-commerce site with an all-purpose balm, a facial mist, a sheer skin tint, and a moisturizer.
Glossier still sells three of these four products; they discontinued the face mist at the end of 2022.

According to Polina Marinova of Fortune, Weiss, "Quietly turned Glossier into one of the most disruptive brands in beauty." She initially pitched the company to 12 firms, with 11 not interested. In February 2018, Weiss released that Glossier had successfully raised an additional $52 million in a Series C round of funding. In March 2019, Weiss announced that Glossier had officially raised $100 million in a Series D round of funding and was valued at $1.2 billion. The round was led by Sequoia Capital and Glossier announced at this time that it more than doubled its revenue in 2018, adding over 1 million new customers.

Since its initial launch with four products, Glossier has expanded its product line to include skin serums, masks, shower gel, body lotion, fragrance, lip balms and several other beauty and skincare related items.

Glossier released a clothing line, GlossiWEAR, on July 17, 2019.

In early 2019, Glossier added Glossier Play to its product umbrella. The line includes pigmented and metallic makeup products, such as eye shadows and eyeliners. In 2020, the company announced plans to suspend the line's production. Weiss stated that launching a sub-brand was, in hindsight, unnecessary, "The realisation we had was, 'Huh, we could have just launched more make-up products'." In August 2020, Weiss and the company were accused of failing to support Black workers at the organization.

In May 2022, Weiss stepped down as CEO of Glossier, but stayed on its board as executive chairwoman. Kyle Leahy, Glossier's former chief commercial officer, took over her position as CEO.

Personal life
In 2016, Weiss married photographer Diego Dueñas in the Bahamas. The union was short-lived.

In 2022, Weiss became engaged to Will Gaybrick, a senior executive at Stripe. The couple announced they were expecting a baby in June 2022. On June 29th, Emily posted on her Instagram announcing the birth of her daughter, Clara Lion Weissbrick.

References

External links
 Emily Weiss at Forbes 40 Under 40

Living people
New York University alumni
American women company founders
American cosmetics businesspeople
American women bloggers
American bloggers
1985 births
21st-century American businesspeople
21st-century American businesswomen
People from Wilton, Connecticut
Businesspeople from Connecticut